Jessica Lauren McCabe (born ) is an American actress, writer, and YouTube personality. She is best known as the host for the YouTube channel How to ADHD as well as for roles in several independent films and television shows including the show American Dreams and the short film Lure.

Early life 
She was diagnosed with ADHD at age 12. Shortly after, she began taking medication, including Ritalin, and seeing a psychiatrist. McCabe struggled to complete community college and dropped out at age 21.

Career

Film and television 
McCabe's on-screen career began as a guest star on the new Dragnet. She followed this up with roles in several independent films including Scorched before landing the role of Becky O'Connor in American Dreams. She followed this up with a recurring role on the NBC drama Windfall.

She next appeared as "Courtney" in the independent short film Lure, which played at the Tribeca Film Festival as well as the London Film Festival and garnered her a win for best actress at the New York Indie Film Fest.

Additional roles include the TNT television series Dark Blue as well as another role in Monk. She made her screenwriting debut in the live action 3-D short film, Happy Ending, in which she also stars.

YouTube (2016-pres.) 
In January 2016, she started her YouTube channel How to ADHD. The channel is dedicated to all topics regarding attention deficit hyperactivity disorder including tips on how to take advantage of the neurodivergent brain type as well as reviews on products such as fidget toys and journals. As of February 2022, the channel has over one million subscribers with its accompanying Patreon gaining over $15,700 a month. Her TEDx talk, which she gave in 2017 has over 1.3 million views as of October 2019.

McCabe provides content regarding the various ways ADHD can be treated, and how those with the condition can live fulfilling lives. Videos featured on the channel cover a wide variety of topics pertaining to living with ADHD.

McCabe is working on a book version of her YouTube channel which will be published by Random House.

Filmography

References

External links 
 
 How to ADHD

American YouTubers
American child actresses
American film actresses
American television actresses
American women writers
Living people
Year of birth missing (living people)
21st-century American actresses
People with attention deficit hyperactivity disorder